Solar International School is an English-medium secondary school established in 2001, located at Sanchore town, of Rajasthan state in India. It is recognised by the Department of Education, Government of Rajasthan. It is being run by a not-for-profit educational society which is registered with the state government.

According to the DISE Report (2009) of the government of India's NUEPA University:
The school was established in 2001 and is managed by Private Unaided Management. It is located in an urban area. It is situated 1 km. from the Block HQ. It is located in Sanchore block of Jalor district of Rajasthan. The school is co-educational and it does not have an attached pre-primary section.

The school has 11 teachers in position against a sanctioned strength of 10 posts. The school has one female teacher. It has no Para-Teacher. The school does not have non-teaching staff. Five teachers have professional certifications/degrees. The Pupil-Teacher Ratio is 16:1 and the Student-Classroom Ratio is 23:1.

References

External links 
 

International schools in India
Schools in Rajasthan
Jalore district
Educational institutions established in 2001
2001 establishments in Rajasthan